John Stuart, 3rd Earl of Bute, served as Prime Minister of Great Britain during 1762–1763. He was the first Tory Prime Minister since the Harley ministry during 1710–1714 though his ministry was largely made up of Whigs.

Bute resigned following fierce criticism of his signing of the Treaty of Paris with its perceived lenient terms for France and Spain despite Britain's successes in the Seven Years' War. The Bute ministry consisted largely of the same members as its successor, the Grenville ministry. George III favoured Bute, but could not keep him in government .

Ministry

See also
 Great Britain in the Seven Years' War
 Cider Bill of 1763

References

 
 
 

British ministries
1762 establishments in Great Britain
1763 disestablishments in Great Britain
1760s in Great Britain
Ministries of George III of the United Kingdom